Ira or IRA may refer to:

Ira (name), a Hebrew, Sanskrit, Russian or Finnish language personal name
Ira (surname), a rare Estonian and some other language family name
Iran, UNDP code IRA

Law
Indian Reorganization Act of 1934, US, on status of Native Americans
Individual retirement account (or individual retirement arrangement), in the US, giving tax benefits
Inflation Reduction Act of 2022, a US budget reconciliation bill
Internal Revenue Allotment, a local share of Philippines government revenue

Music
Ira (Polish band), a Polish heavy metal band
Ira!, a Brazilian rock band
I.R.A. (band), a Colombian punk band
One part of an Andean wind instrument, the siku

Organizations
Indian Reunification Association
 Indian Rationalist Association
 Indian Rights Association, US, for Native Americans
 Initiative for the Resurgence of the Abolitionist Movement (IRA), a Mauritania anti-slavery group
 Insurance Regulatory Authority (Kenya), the authority charged with regulation and supervision of Kenya's insurance industry
 Intercollegiate Rowing Association, US
 International Reading Association, now the International Literacy Association
 Internet Research Agency or "The Trolls of Olgino", a Russian state-sponsored troll group
 ICAO designator for Iran Air, an Iranian airline
 Irish Republican Army, which has existed in various forms since 1917:
 Irish Republican Army (1919–1922)
 Irish Republican Army (1922–1969)
 Official Irish Republican Army (1969–1972)
 Provisional Irish Republican Army (1969–2005)
 Continuity Irish Republican Army (1986/1994–present)
 Real Irish Republican Army (1997–2012)
 New IRA (2012–present)
 Islamabad Rugby Association
 Íslenskir Radíóamatörar, ÍRA, an amateur radio organization in Iceland

Places

United States
Ira, Iowa
Ira Township, Michigan
Ira, Missouri
Ira, New York
Ira, Texas
Hopewell, Red River County, Texas, formerly Ira
Ira, Vermont

Elsewhere
Ire (Iliad) or Ira, a town mentioned in the Iliad
Ira (Lesbos), a town of ancient Lesbos, Greece
Eira (Messenia), or Ira, an ancient town of Messenia, Greece
Eira, Messenia or Ira, a municipality in northern Messenia, Greece
Ira, Mazandaran, a village in Mazandaran Province, Iran
Ira, Syria, a village in as-Suwayda Governorate, Syria
Ira, Tehran, a village in Tehran Province, Iran
Lielirbe or Īra, Latvia
Islamic Republic of Afghanistan, an Official name of Afghanistan in Exile.

Other uses
Ira, Latin for wrath, one of the seven deadly sins
Ira (film), a 2018 Indian (Malayalam) film
Ira (mythology), a goddess in Polynesian mythology
Ira (moth), a moth genus
Irina or Ira, a given name
Inherited runs allowed, a baseball statistic
International Reference Alphabet, a character encoding
Ileorectal Anastomosis, surgery to join the ileum with the rectum